Almalu (also Romanized as Ālmālū; also known as Almali) is a village in Zanjanrud-e Pain Rural District, Zanjanrud District, Zanjan County, Zanjan Province, Iran. At the 2006 census, its population was 67, in 16 families.

References 

Populated places in Zanjan County